Durarara!! is a Japanese manga series written by Ryohgo Narita and illustrated by Akiyo Satorigi. Based on the light novel series of the same name, the series follows an eccentric group of citizens residing in Ikebukuro who form various connections through dealings with the local gangs – one of which is the "Dollars," a so-called invisible gang which no one seems to know much about. On top of all of this, the city is enraptured by the urban legend of the "Black Rider," the supposedly headless pilot of a black motorcycle.

The manga is serialized monthly in Square Enix's shōnen manga magazine Monthly GFantasy since May 2009. Yen Press licensed the manga series at Comic-Con International Con 2011, and began releasing the series in English in North America in January 2012.


Volume list

Saika Arc (罪歌編)

Yellow Scarves Arc (黄巾賊編)

See also

List of Durarara!! episodes

References

External links 
 

Duarara!!